Kamikaze Taxi (stylized as KAMIKAZE TAXI in Japan) is a 1995 Japanese action and crime film by director Masato Harada. The film is about Tatsuo (Kazuya Takahashi), a gangster and pimp who sends out his only prostitute (Reiko Kataoka) to service a politician. When she returns beaten, Tatsuo's girlfriend complains but is killed by crime boss Animaru (Mickey Curtis). Tatsuo seeks revenge as he and his gang vandalize the politician's house and steal money. In retaliation, Tatsuo's bosses put a hit out on them. He flees, riding in the taxi driven by a Peruvian Japanese named Kantake (Kōji Yakusho). The film was shown at the 1995 London Film Festival and actor Mickey Curtis won the Kinema Junpo Award for best supporting actor in 1996 for his work in the film.

Production
The soundtrack for Kamikaze Taxi was composed by Masahiro Kawasaki, who used Peruvian pipes. To deal with the Peruvian-Japanese taxi driver character in the film, director Masato Harada had Kawasaki listen to tapes of Peruvian music to come up with a similar sound.

Release
Kamikaze Taxi was released in Japan on April 25, 1995.
The film was shown at the 1995 London Film Festival.

Reception
Mickey Curtis won the Kinema Junpo Award for best supporting actor in 1996 for his work in the film. Time magazine stated that "the narrative is overly long (160 minutes) and lacks cohesion. But the film has an epic lunacy, a satiric darkness. Its neon-lit nightscapes and vivid brutality dance, shock--and leave the viewer both riveted and repulsed." Variety also commented on the films length, noting "Though the film could easily lose a quarter of an hour from a self-indulgent sequence in a group-therapy clinic, there's actually very little slackness during the 170-minute running time."

Cast
Kōji Yakusho as Kantake
Kazuya Takahashi as Tatsuo
Reiko Kataoka as Tama
Kenichi Yajima as Ishida
Takeshi Caesar
Mickey Curtis as Animaru
Taketoshi Naito as Domon

Notes

External links

1995 action thriller films
1995 crime thriller films
Japanese action thriller films
Yakuza films
Films directed by Masato Harada
1990s Japanese films